Ardeutica mezion is a species of moth of the family Tortricidae. It is found on Cuba.

References

Moths described in 1984
Polyorthini
Moths of the Caribbean
Endemic fauna of Cuba